The 14th Street station was a local station on the demolished IRT Third Avenue Line in Manhattan, New York City. It had two levels. The lower level was served by local trains and had two tracks and two side platforms. It was built first. The upper level was built as part of the Dual Contracts and had one track that bypassed the station and served express trains. In 1924, the Brooklyn–Manhattan Transit Corporation built the 14th Street-Eastern District Line Subway below the station, which included the Third Avenue subway station. Although this station was located above the Third Avenue BMT subway station on what is today known as the BMT Canarsie Line, the two stations were never connected. This station closed on May 12, 1955, with the ending of all service on the Third Avenue El south of 149th Street.

References

External links

IRT Third Avenue Line stations
Former elevated and subway stations in Manhattan
Railway stations in the United States opened in 1878
Railway stations closed in 1955
1878 establishments in New York (state)
1955 disestablishments in New York (state)

Third Avenue
14th Street (Manhattan)